Gunda Mallesh (14 July 1947 - 13 October 2020) was an Indian politician and leader of Communist Party of India (CPI). He had won as the legislator in 1983, 1985 and 1994 from Asifabad constituency. In 2009, he was elected as the MLA of Bellampalli constituency, and served as the floor leader of the CPI.

References

1947 births
2020 deaths
Indian politicians
People from Adilabad district
Members of the Andhra Pradesh Legislative Assembly
Communist Party of India politicians from Telangana